Journal of Fungi is a peer-reviewed open access scientific journal published by MDPI quarterly covering all aspects of Fungi. It was established in 2015. The editor in chief is David S. Perlin (Hackensack Meridian Health Center for Discovery and Innovation). The journal is associated with the European Confederation of Medical Mycology.

Abstracting and indexing
The journal is abstracted and indexed in:
Biological Abstracts
BIOSIS Previews
Chemical Abstracts Service
Current Contents/Life Sciences
Scopus
Science Citation Index Expanded

References

External links

Mycology journals
MDPI academic journals
Quarterly journals
Publications established in 2015
English-language journals